Helical railguns are multi-turn railguns that reduce rail and brush current by a factor equal to the number of turns. Two rails are surrounded by a helical barrel and the projectile or re-usable carrier is cylindrical. The projectile is energized continuously by two brushes sliding along the rails, and two or more additional brushes on the projectile serve to energize and commute several windings of the helical barrel direction in front of and/or behind the projectile. The helical railgun is a cross between a railgun and a coilgun. They do not currently exist in a practical, usable form.

A helical railgun was built at MIT in 1980 and was powered by several banks of, for the time, large capacitors (approximately 4 farads). It was about 3 meters long, consisting of 2 meters of accelerating coil and 1 meter of decelerating coil. It was able to launch a glider or projectile about 500 meters.

See also
Railgun
Plasma railgun
Coilgun
Mass driver
Ram accelerator
Light-gas gun
Electrothermal-chemical technology
Henry Kolm

References

Specific

Electromagnetic components
Artillery by type
Railguns